Knockin is a civil parish in Shropshire, England.  It contains 17 listed buildings that are recorded in the National Heritage List for England.  Of these, one is at Grade II*, the middle of the three grades, and the others are at Grade II, the lowest grade.  The parish contains the villages of Knockin and Osbaston, and the surrounding countryside.  The listed buildings include a church, houses, cottages, and farmhouses, a country house, an animal pound, three bridges, and a war memorial.


Key

Buildings

References

Citations

Sources

Lists of buildings and structures in Shropshire